The International Ettore Pozzoli Piano Competition, for tradition and amount of prize, is one of the oldest and most prestigious piano competitions in the world, taking place in Seregno, Italy since 1959 and held every 2 years.

The Story 

The contest was founded by Gina Gambini, widow of the Italian pianist, Maestro Ettore Pozzoli, wishing to honour the memory of her husband by giving musicians from all over the world an opportunity to show their artistic skills. 
Up to now, more than 1.500 pianists coming from all over the world have participated in the 25 editions of the competition that has taken place in the city in northern Italy. In 1959, the first pianist to win the International Ettore Pozzoli Piano Competition was Maestro Maurizio Pollini, now considered one of the major musicians in the world. 
The last edition (XXVI°) took place in September 2009, celebrating the 50th year of the Competition foundation and was won by the young American pianist, Maestro Christopher Falzone.

Prize winners

See also 
 List of classical music competitions
 World Federation of International Music Competitions

References

External links 
 Official International Ettore Pozzoli Piano Competition website
 Directory of International Piano Competitions

Piano competitions
Music competitions in Italy